Endocrossis is a genus of moths of the family Crambidae.

Species
Endocrossis caldusalis (Walker, 1859)
Endocrossis flavibasalis (Moore, 1867)
Endocrossis kenricki Swinhoe, 1916
Endocrossis quinquemaculalis Sauber in Semper, 1899

Former species
Endocrossis fulviterminalis (Hampson, 1898)

References

Spilomelinae
Crambidae genera
Taxa named by Edward Meyrick